Yoo JaeHoon is the Chairman and President of the Korea Deposit Insurance Corporation (KDIC). He is also working as ex-officio Commissioner of the Financial Services Commission (South Korea), and a member of the Executive Council of the International Association of Deposit Insurers (IADI).

Early life 
Yoo has a BA in economics and an MA in public administration from Seoul National University, and an MA (DEA) in international economics at Sciences Po de Paris. He graduated from the Ecole Nationale d'Administration (ENA) in France. He obtained a PhD in economics from Kyonggi University in 2011.

Career 
During his 30-year career in public service, he worked on capital market development, financial policy, and international cooperation for developing countries.

From 1997 to 2000, Yoo worked as an economist at the Asian Development Bank (ADB) in Manila. He served as a senior securities market specialist at the World Bank (WB) and International Finance Corporation (IFC) between 2005 and 2008. Yoo was the president of the Sciences Po de Paris Korean Alumni Association.

He worked as Spokesperson for the Financial Services Commission (South Korea) from 2008 to 2009. He worked as s Director General of the Treasury Bureau at the Ministry of Strategy and Finance (South Korea) from December 2009 to March 2011. He served as Commissioner of the Securities and Futures Commission (SFC) from April 2012. He worked as Chairman and CEO of Korea Securities Depository (KSD) from November 2013 to October 2016. Yoo also worked as Director General and Controller of Asian Infrastructure Investment Bank (AIIB) from 2016 to 2019.

From 2017 to 2022, Yoo worked as a member of the International Advisory Council (IAC) of the China Securities Regulatory Commission (CSRC).

He served as chair professor of the Graduate School of Public Administration at Konkuk University in Korea and vice-dean of the China-Japan-Korea Research Institute at Shandong University of Finance and Economics in China from 2019 to 2022.

Social Work 
He has been actively engaged in several social works including Asia Future Institute (Chairman, 2016-2019, public diplomacy), Global Overseas Adoptees' Link (Chairman, 2016-2019, volunteer) and China Capital Market Society (Founding Chairman, 2009-2019, financial research) in Korea.

Publications
Yoo's publications include The Korean Bond Market: The Next Frontiers (2008) and Development Strategy for China Capital Market (2008). He published the papers Financing Innovation: How to Build an Efficient Exchange for Small Firms (2008) and Study on the Financial Characteristics and Financing Patterns of Innovative Firms (2011). He wrote a book “Creating an Artificial Sun (2016)” that sheds light on Korea’s capital market development.

References

Living people
South Korean chief executives
Year of birth missing (living people)